Steere's spiny rat (Proechimys steerei) is a spiny rat species found in Bolivia, Brazil and Peru.

Phylogeny
Morphological characters and mitochondrial cytochrome b DNA sequences showed that P. steerei belongs to the so-called goeldii group of Proechimys species, and shares closer phylogenetic affinities with the other members of this clade: P. quadruplicatus and P. goeldii.

References

Proechimys
Mammals described in 1911
Taxa named by Edward Alphonso Goldman